Ebonshire - Volume 2 is the 21st album released by Nox Arcana. It is the second in a series of winter holiday EPs inspired by Nox Arcana's holiday music trilogy: Winter's Knight (2005), Winter's Eve (2009), and Winter's Majesty (2012), which are each set in a fantasy realm called Ebonshire.

Composer Joseph Vargo explained that each year a new volume of songs is to be added to the Ebonshire series for the winter holiday season.

Track listing
 Drifting Ivory — 3:56
 Hearthside Lullaby — 3:24
 Winterdream — 3:42
 Rex Ventorum — 3:52

References

External links 
 
[ Ebonshire Volume 2] at Allmusic

Nox Arcana albums
2014 albums
2014 Christmas albums
Christmas EPs
Christmas albums by American artists
New-age Christmas albums